Drumragh is a civil parish and townland in County Tyrone, Northern Ireland, on the right bank of the River Drumragh. Today, it is within the county town of Omagh. It has a Roman Catholic church; and a Church of Ireland one.

References

Civil parishes of County Tyrone
Omagh